Daniel Hyde may refer to:

 Daniel Hyde (actor), British actor
 Daniel Hyde (organist), director of music for the choir of King's College, Cambridge